Jean-Christophe Bailly (3 May 1949) is a French writer, poet and playwright.

Biography 
Bailly was born in Paris. Very early on, he decided to devote himself to writing. His book Tuiles detachées explains this decision, as well as several important steps for the formation of his style. Close to surrealism when he entered literature, he moved away from it. His thought constitutes the modern continuity of certain ideas of German romanticism: the idea of a sense without borders and moving forms, in the spirit of what Novalis calls the "Encyclopedia".

Works

Essays 
1968: Célébration de la boule, Le Jas-du-Revest-Saint-Martin, Robert Morel, fascicule (47 p.) 
1971: Au-delà du langage : essai sur Benjamin Péret, Éric Losfeld
1973: Jean-Pierre Duprey, 
1976: La Légende dispersée : Anthologie du romantisme allemand, 
1978: Wozu ? : à quoi bon des poètes en un temps de manque ? (codirected with ), Le Soleil Noir
1980: Le Vingt janvier, Bourgois
1989: Le Paradis du sens, Bourgois
1990: L’Atelier bleu, La Pionnière
1991: La Fin de l’hymne, Bourgois
1991: La Comparution (politique à venir) (with Jean-Luc Nancy), Bourgois
1992: La Ville à l’œuvre, Bertoin
1993: Adieu : essai sur la mort des dieux, La Tour-d'Aigues, 
1997: Le Propre du langage, voyages au pays des noms communs, Paris, Éditions du Seuil
2000: Panoramiques, Bourgois
2004: Le Pays des animots, Paris, 
2005: Le Champ mimétique, Seuil, 2005 
2006: Rimbaud parti (with Jacqueline Salmon), Paris, Éditions Marval
2007: Le Versant animal, Bayard
2008: L’Instant et son ombre, Seuil
2009: Le Visible est le caché, Paris, Le Promeneur
2009: Le Temps fixé, Bayard
2011: La Véridiction sur Philippe Lacoue-Labarthe, Bourgois
2012: "L'action solitaire du poème", in Toi aussi tu as des armes - Poésie et politique, collective work, Paris, La Fabrique éditions, 
2013: Le Parti pris des animaux, Seuil
2013: La Phrase urbaine, Seuil
2015: L’Élargissement du poème, Bourgois, series "Détroits"

Narratives 
1985: Beau fixe, Paris, Bourgois
1990: Phèdre en Inde, Paris, Plon
1992: , Bourgois, Prix France Culture
1996: Le Maître du montage (followed by l`Énigme by Jacques Monory), Nantes, Joca seria
2004: Tuiles détachées, Paris, Mercure de France
2010: Dans l'étendu (Colombie-Argentine), Lyon, Fage
2011: , Le Seuil - Prix Décembre 2011.

Texts on art 
1976: Max Ernst : apprentissage, énigme, apologie (with Henri-Alexis Baatsch and Alain Jouffroy), Bourgois and Éditions étrangères
1977: Hommage à Caspar David Friedrich (with Jacques Monory), Bourgois
1979: Monory, Paris, Maeght
1984: Duchamp, Paris, 
1988: Piotr Kowalski, Hazan
1989: Mine de rien, Paris, Galerie de France
1992: Regarder la peinture, Hazan
1993: Kurt Schwitters, Hazan
1997: L'Apostrophe muette : essai sur les portraits du Fayoum, Hazan
2000: Jacques Monory, Neuchâtel, Ides et calendes
2005: Gilles Aillaud, Marseille, André Dimanche
2007: L'Atelier infini: 30.000 ans de peinture, Hazan
2011: Monory photographe, catalogue Galerie Rue Visconti, Paris
2012: Bernard Moninot, André Dimanche
2013: Dead Cities, Guillaume Greff, Kaiserin Editions, Reykjavík

Poetry 
1973: L'Astrolabe dans la passe des Français, Seghers
1973: Le Gramme des sursauts, Paris, Éditions étrangères 
1975: Défaire le vide, Éditions étrangères et Bourgois
1979: L'Étoilement, Montpellier, 
1983: Per modo di vestigio (with Hervé Bordas), Copal
1985: Pluie douce (with ), Marseille, André Dimanche
1991: L'Oiseau Nyiro, Geneva, La Dogana 
1999: Blanc sur noir, Bordeaux, William Blake and Co.
2000: Basse continue, Seuil

Theatre 
1983: Les Céphéides, Bourgois
1987: Le Régent, Bourgois
1989: La Medesima strada (with Gilles Aillaud and K. M. Grüber), Bourgois
1992: Pandora, Bourgois
1995: Lumières (with M. Deutsch, J.-F. Duroure and G. Lavaudant), Bourgois
2003: El Pelele, Bourgois
2003: Poursuites, Bourgois
2005: Villeggiatura (with ), Nantes, 
2006: Une nuit à la bibliothèque followed by Fuochi sparsi, Bourgois

Bibliography 
 Bailly, Jean-Christophe (with Jean-Marc Besse, Philippe Grand, and Gilles Palsky). (2019): An Atlas of Geographical Wonders. From Mountaintops to Riverbeds. New York, Princeton Architectural Press, 2019, .
 Jean-Christophe Bailly, Europe, n° 1046, June 2016 : texts by Jean-Christophe Bailly, contributions de Henri-Alexis Baatsch, Jacques Bonnaffé, Stéphane Bouquet, Laurent Demanze, Michel Deutsch, Brigitte Ferrato-Combe, Fabrice Gabriel, Marielle Macé, Jean-Pierre Montier, Jean-Luc Nancy, Muriel Pic, Nathalie Piégay, Catherine Robert, Nina Rocipon, Michel Sandras, Patrick Talbot, Gilbert Vaudey.

References

External links 
 Bibliographie sur theatre-contemporain.net
 Conférence de Jean-Christophe Bailly sur l’œuvre de Georg Büchner à la BnF le 2 février 2011

1949 births
Writers from Paris
20th-century French male writers
20th-century French dramatists and playwrights
21st-century French dramatists and playwrights
20th-century French poets
Prix Décembre winners
Prix France Culture winners
Living people
21st-century French male writers